Herbert Schäfer (16 August 1927 in Siegen – 16 May 1991 in Siegen) was a German international footballer who played for Sportfreunde Siegen. He also competed in the 1952 Summer Olympics and in the 1956 Summer Olympics.

References

1927 births
1991 deaths
Sportspeople from Siegen
German footballers
Germany international footballers
Association football midfielders
Sportfreunde Siegen players
Olympic footballers of Germany
Olympic footballers of the United Team of Germany
Footballers at the 1952 Summer Olympics
Footballers at the 1956 Summer Olympics
German footballers needing infoboxes
Footballers from North Rhine-Westphalia